Azadlıq prospekti is a Baku Metro station. It was opened on 30 December 2009.

See also
List of Baku metro stations

References

Baku Metro stations
Railway stations opened in 2009
2009 establishments in Azerbaijan